SLC2A4 regulator is a protein that in humans is encoded by the SLC2A4RG gene.

The protein encoded by this gene is a nuclear transcription factor involved in the activation of the solute carrier family 2 member 4 gene. The encoded protein interacts with another transcription factor, myocyte enhancer factor 2, to activate transcription of this gene.

References

Further reading